Gurmunow (also Romanized as Gūrmūnow; also known as Gormūnow and Gormūnū) is a village in Isin Rural District, in the Central District of Bandar Abbas County, Hormozgan Province, Iran. At the 2006 census, its population was 11, in 6 families.

References 

Populated places in Bandar Abbas County